So's Your Old Man is a 1926 American silent comedy film directed by Gregory La Cava and starring W. C. Fields and Alice Joyce. It was written by J. Clarkson Miller based on the story "Mr. Bisbee's Princess" by Julian Leonard Street as adapted by Howard Emmett Rogers. It was filmed at Astoria Studios in Queens, New York City.

The film was remade as a talkie in 1934, with W. C. Fields again starring, under the title You're Telling Me!  In 2008, So's Your Old Man was added to the United States National Film Registry.

Plot
Sam Bisbee (W. C. Fields) is a small-town glazier who's always trying to get rich quick, and his schemes are driving his wife (Marcia Harris) crazy.  When he invents an unbreakable glass windshield, his attempt to demonstrate it at a convention of automobile manufacturers is ruined when his car gets switched with another, and instead of bouncing off, the brick he throws at it smashes the windshield to pieces. On the train ride home, Bisbee considers suicide, but instead rescues a pretty young woman (Alice Joyce) whom he believes is trying to kill herself. It turns out the woman is really Princess Lescaboura, and their friendship brings social success to the Bisbees.

Cast
W. C. Fields as Samuel Bisbee
Alice Joyce as Princess Lescaboura
Charles "Buddy" Rogers as Kenneth Murchison
Kittens Reichert as Alice Bisbee (credited as Catherine Reichert)
Marcia Harris as Mrs. Bisbee
Julia Ralph as Mrs. A. Brandewyne Murchison
Frank Montgomery as Jeff, a fellow scientist
Jerry Sinclair as Al
Frederick Burton as Senator (uncredited)
Charles Byer as Prince Lescaboura (uncredited)
Walter Walker as Mayor of Waukeagus (uncredited)

Notes

External links

So's Your Old Man essay by Steve Massa on National Film Registry
So's Your Old Man essay in America's Film Legacy: The Authoritative Guide to the Landmark Movies in the National Film Registry, A&C Black, 2010 , pages 121–122.

1926 films
Silent American comedy films
American black-and-white films
American silent feature films
United States National Film Registry films
Films directed by Gregory La Cava
Films shot at Astoria Studios
Surviving American silent films
1926 comedy films
1920s American films